The 2014 Coates Hire Rally Australia was the tenth round of the 2014 World Rally Championship season. The event was based in Coffs Harbour, New South Wales, and started on 12 September and finished on 14 September after twenty special stages, totaling 304.3 competitive kilometres.

French driver Sébastien Ogier won the Rally Australia for the second time, taking his sixth victory of the 2014 season. Volkswagen completed a podium lockout by having all three cars finishing in podium positions at the end of the rally.

Entry list

Results

Event standings

Special stages

Power Stage
The "Power stage" was a  stage at the end of the rally.

Standings after the rally

WRC

Drivers' Championship standings

Manufacturers' Championship standings

Other

WRC2 Drivers' Championship standings

WRC3 Drivers' Championship standings

Junior WRC Drivers' Championship standings

References

Results – juwra.com/World Rally Archive
Results – ewrc-results.com

Australia
Rally Australia
Rally